Mikko Olavi Hult (22 March 1915 in Rautalampi – 6 May 1993) was a Finnish smallholder and politician. He was a member of the Parliament of Finland from 1954 to 1962. Hult first represented the Social Democratic Party of Finland (SDP), and later the Social Democratic Union of Workers and Smallholders (TPSL).

References

1915 births
1993 deaths
People from Rautalampi
People from Kuopio Province (Grand Duchy of Finland)
Social Democratic Party of Finland politicians
Social Democratic Union of Workers and Smallholders politicians
Members of the Parliament of Finland (1954–58)
Members of the Parliament of Finland (1958–62)